The province of Quebec is divided into 36 judicial districts by the Territorial Division Act, R.S.Q., chapter D-11. Each district has a seat where the courthouse is located, although some have more than one courthouse, service point, or itinerant court location.

Quebec law